The two-step is a step found in various dances, including many folk dances. 

A two-step consists of two steps in approximately the same direction onto the same foot, separated by a joining or uniting step with the other foot. For example, a right two-step forward is a forward step onto the right foot, a closing step with the left foot, and a forward step onto the right foot. The closing step may be done directly beside the other foot, or obliquely beside, or even crossed, as long as the closing foot does not go past the other foot.

The two-step is often confused with the country/western two-step.

See also
Triple step
Lock step
Dance move

References

Social dance steps